Stainton is a village near the A66, in the parish of Dacre, in the Eden district, in the English county of Cumbria. It is a few miles away from the market town of Penrith. It is in the parish of Dacre, although it is larger than Dacre. It has a Methodist church and a primary school. In 2019 the built-up area had an estimated population of 758. In 1870-72 the township had a population of 330.

See also

Listed buildings in Dacre, Cumbria

References 

 Philip's Street Atlas Cumbria

External links 

  Cumbria County History Trust: Dacre (nb: provisional research only - see Talk page)
 https://web.archive.org/web/20110927181615/http://www.axcis.co.uk/schools-directory/Stainton-CE-Primary-School/43428
 Lake District Walks

Villages in Cumbria
Dacre, Cumbria